In cryptography, XTR is an algorithm for public-key encryption. XTR stands for 'ECSTR', which is an abbreviation for Efficient and Compact Subgroup Trace Representation. It is a method to represent elements of a subgroup of a multiplicative group of a finite field.

From a security point of view, XTR relies on the difficulty of solving Discrete Logarithm related problems in the full multiplicative group of a finite field. Some other advantages of XTR are its fast key generation, small key sizes and speed.

Fundamentals of XTR 
XTR uses a subgroup, commonly referred to as XTR subgroup or just  XTR group, of a subgroup called XTR supergroup, of the multiplicative group of a finite field  with  elements. The XTR supergroup is of order , where p is a prime such that a sufficiently large prime q divides .

Arithmetic operations in  
Let p be a prime such that p ≡ 2 mod 3 and p2 - p + 1 has a sufficiently large prime factor q. Since p2 ≡ 1 mod 3 we see that p generates  and thus the third cyclotomic polynomial

Considering that p ≡ 2 mod 3 we can reduce the exponents modulo 3 to get

The cost of arithmetic operations is now given in the following Lemma labeled Lemma 2.21 in "An overview of the XTR public key system":

Lemma

 Computing xp is done without using multiplication
 Computing x2 takes two multiplications in 
 Computing xy takes three multiplications in 

Traces over  

Note that  since 

Consider now the generator  of the XTR subgroup of a prime order . Remember that  is a subgroup of the XTR supergroup of order , so . To compute the trace of  note that modulo  we have
 and

and thus

The product of the conjugates of  equals ,
i.e., that  has norm 1.

simplifies to 

This is, however, only useful if there is a quick way to obtain  given . In addition, computing  given  turns out to be quicker than computing  given .

Algorithm for the quick computation of  given  
A. Lenstra and E. Verheul give this algorithm in their paper titled The XTR public key system in. All the definitions and lemmas necessary for the algorithm and the algorithm itself presented here, are taken from that paper.

Definition For c in  define

Define

 
 
 
 
  is reducible over  if and only if 

Lemma 
Let  be given.

Definition Let .

Algorithm 1 for computation of  given  and 
 If , then .
 If , then .
 If , to compute  define

and  if n is odd and  otherwise. Let further

For  in succession, do the following:
 If , use  to compute .
 If , use  to compute .
If n is even use  to compute .

Parameter selection

Finite field and subgroup size selection

To achieve  security comparable to 1024-bit RSA, we should choose  about 1024, i.e.  and  can be around 160.

Algorithm A

 Find  such that  is a -bit prime.

Correctness of Algorithm A:

We easily see that  which implies that .

Algorithm A is very fast and can be used to find primes  that satisfy a degree-two polynomial with small coefficients.

On the other hand, such  may be undesirable from a security point of view because they may make an attack with the Discrete Logarithm variant of the Number Field Sieve easier.

The following Algorithm B doesn't have this disadvantage, but it also doesn't have the fast arithmetic modulo  Algorithm A has in that case.

Algorithm B

 Select a -bit prime  so that .

Correctness of Algorithm B:
Since we chose   it follows immediately that   (because   and  ). From that and quadratic reciprocity we can deduce that   and  exist.

Subgroup selection

However, we do not need to find an explicit , it suffices to find an element  such that  for an element  of order .
To find such a  we can take a look at property 5 of  here stating that the roots of  have an order dividing  if and only if  is irreducible. After finding such  we need to check if it really is of order , but first we focus on how to select  such that  is irreducible.

An initial approach is to select  randomly which is justified by the next lemma.

Lemma: For a randomly selected  the probability that  is irreducible is about one third.

Now the basic algorithm to find a suitable  is as follows:

Outline of the algorithm

 Pick a random .
 If  is reducible, then return to Step 1.
 Use Algorithm 1 to compute .
 If  is not of order , return to Step 1.
 Let .

More details to the algorithm, its correctness, runtime and the proof of the Lemma can be found in "An overview of the XTR public key system" in.

Cryptographic schemes 

In this section it is explained how the concepts above using traces of elements can be applied to cryptography. In general, XTR can be used in any cryptosystem that relies on the (subgroup) Discrete Logarithm problem. Two important applications of XTR are the Diffie–Hellman key agreement and the ElGamal encryption. We will start first with Diffie–Hellman.

XTR-DH key agreement 

We suppose that both Alice and Bob have access to the XTR public key data  and intend to agree on a shared secret key . They can do this by using the following XTR version of the Diffie–Hellman key exchange:

XTR ElGamal encryption 

For the ElGamal encryption we suppose now that Alice is the owner of the XTR public key data  and that she has selected a secret integer , computed  and published the result.
Given Alice's XTR public key data , Bob can encrypt a message , intended for Alice, using the following XTR version of the ElGamal encryption:

 Bob next applies Algorithm 1 to compute .
 Bob uses an agreed upon symmetric encryption method with key  to encrypt his message , resulting in the encryption .
 Bob sends  to Alice.

 Alice computes .
 Alice uses the agreed upon symmetric encryption method with key  to decrypt , resulting in the original message .

The here described encryption scheme is based on a common hybrid version of the ElGamal encryption, where the secret key  is obtained by an asymmetric public key system and then the message is encrypted with a symmetric key encryption method Alice and Bob agreed to.

In the more traditional ElGamal encryption the message is restricted to the key space, which would here be , because . The encryption in this case is the multiplication of the message with the key, which is an invertible operation in the key space .

Security

In order to say something about the security properties of the above explained XTR encryption scheme, first it is important to check the security of the XTR group, which means how hard it is to solve the Discrete Logarithm problem there. The next part will then state the equivalency between the Discrete Logarithm problem in the XTR group and the XTR version of the discrete logarithm problem, using only the traces of elements.

Discrete logarithms in a general 

Let now  be a multiplicative group of order . The security of the Diffie–Hellman protocol in  relies on the Diffie–Hellman (DH) problem of computing . We write .
There are two other problems related to the DH problem. The first one is the Diffie–Hellman Decision (DHD) problem to determine if  for given  and the second one is the Discrete Logarithm (DL) problem to find  for a given .

Hence  can safely be assumed to be prime.

One can either focus on the whole multiplicative group or on the subgroup.

Security of XTR 

Cryptographic protocols that are based on Discrete Logarithms can use many different types of subgroups like groups of points of elliptic curves or subgroups of the multiplicative group of a finite field like the XTR group.
As we have seen above the XTR versions of the Diffie–Hellman and ElGamal encryption protocol replace using elements of the XTR group by using their traces. 
This means that the security of the XTR versions of these encryption schemes is no longer based on the original DH, DHD or DL problems. 
Therefore, the XTR versions of those problems need to be defined and we will see that they are equivalent (in the sense of the next definition) to the original problems.

Definitions:
Given , the XTR-DL problem is to find , i.e.  such that .
 We say that problem  is (a,b)-equivalent to problem , if any instance of problem  (or ) can be solved by at most a (or b) calls to an algorithm solving problem  (or ).

After introducing the XTR versions of these problems the next theorem is an important result telling us the connection between the XTR and the non-XTR problems, which are in fact equivalent. This implies that the XTR representation of elements with their traces is, as can be seen above, faster by a factor of 3 than the usual representation without compromising security.

Theorem   The following equivalencies hold:
i.
ii.
iii.

This means that an algorithm solving either XTR-DL, XTR-DH or XTR-DHD with non-negligible probability can be transformed into an algorithm solving the corresponding non-XTR problem DL, DH or DHD with non-negligible probability and vice versa.
In particular part ii. implies that determining the small XTR-DH key (being an element of ) is as hard as determining the whole DH key (being an element of  ) in the representation group .

References 

Asymmetric-key algorithms
Finite fields